Clonmel was a United Kingdom Parliament constituency, in Ireland, returning one MP. It was an original constituency represented in Parliament when the Union of Great Britain and Ireland took effect on 1 January 1801.

History
The corporation of Clonmel, which was the local government of its area, was reformed by the Municipal Corporations (Ireland) Act 1840. The parliamentary borough was not affected by this change in administrative arrangements.

Samuel Lewis, writing in 1837, described the oligarchic constitution of the unreformed borough.

Boundaries
This constituency was the parliamentary borough of Clonmel in County Tipperary.

The boundary of the borough was defined in the Parliamentary Boundaries (Ireland) Act 1832 as:

Members of Parliament

Elections

Elections in the 1830s

Ronayne's death caused a by-election.

Ball was appointed as Attorney General for Ireland, requiring a by-election.

Ball was appointed a judge of the Court of Common Pleas in Ireland, causing a by-election.

Elections in the 1840s
Pigot was appointed Attorney General for Ireland, requiring a by-election.

Pigot resigned after being appointed Chief Baron of the Irish Exchequer, causing a by-election.

Elections in the 1850s

Lawless' death caused a by-election.

O'Connell resigned after being appointed Clerk of the Crown and Hanaper at Dublin Castle, causing a by-election.

Bagwell was appointed a Lord Commissioner of the Treasury, requiring a by-election.

Elections in the 1860s

Elections in the 1870s

Elections in the 1880s

Notes

References
The Parliaments of England by Henry Stooks Smith (1st edition published in three volumes 1844–50), 2nd edition edited (in one volume) by F.W.S. Craig (Political Reference Publications 1973)

External links
Part of the Library Ireland: Irish History and Culture website containing the text of A Topographical Directory of Ireland, by Samuel Lewis (a work published by S. Lewis & Co of London in 1837) including an article on Clonmel

Westminster constituencies in County Tipperary (historic)
Constituencies of the Parliament of the United Kingdom established in 1801
Constituencies of the Parliament of the United Kingdom disestablished in 1885
Clonmel